Mohammad Imlaq Khan is an Indian politician and member of the Uttar Pradesh Legislative Council. He represents the constituency Bahraich as a member of the Samajwadi Party.

References 

Year of birth missing (living people)
Living people
Uttar Pradesh politicians
Samajwadi Party politicians from Uttar Pradesh